Epsilon is a programmer's text editor modelled after Emacs. It resembles Emacs not only in its default keybindings and layout, but also in the fact that it has a Turing-complete extension language in which much of its functionality is implemented. Unlike Emacs, Epsilon's extension language, EEL (Epsilon Extension Language) is a dialect of C rather than a dialect of Lisp. Epsilon runs on DOS, Microsoft Windows, Linux, FreeBSD, Mac OS X and OS/2.

Epsilon is a commercial product sold by Lugaru Software. It was first released in 1984, long before Emacs was available on personal computers, and it provided an attractive alternative to the usual DOS editors for those accustomed to Emacs. It was also the first DOS based editor to allow editing of files that were larger than available RAM, and one of the first to allow running programs (such as compilers) in the background while allowing editing to proceed concurrently on DOS.

Epsilon supports Unicode but does not display characters outside the BMP and cannot presently handle right-to-left scripts. It can convert among dozens of character encodings.

Reception
BYTE in 1989 listed Epsilon as among the "Distinction" winners of the BYTE Awards, especially praising EEL.

References

External links
Epsilon homepage

Emacs
DOS text editors